The following are known battles of the Russo-Japanese War, including all major engagements. 

The Russo-Japanese War lasted from 1904 until 1905. The conflict grew out of the rival imperialist ambitions of the Russian Empire and the Japanese Empire over Manchuria and Korea. The major theatres of operations were Southern Manchuria, specifically the area around the Liaodong Peninsula and Mukden, and the seas around Korea, Japan, and the Yellow Sea.  

The Russians were in constant pursuit of a warm-water port on the Pacific Ocean, for their navy as well as for maritime trade. The recently established Pacific seaport of Vladivostok was the only active Russian port that was reasonably operational during the summer season; but Port Arthur would be operational all year. Negotiations between the Tsar's government and Japan between the end of the First Sino-Japanese War and 1903 had proved futile. The Japanese chose war to maintain exclusive dominance in Korea.

The resulting campaigns, in which the fledgling Japanese military consistently attained victory over the Russian forces arrayed against them, were unexpected by world observers. These victories, as time transpired, would dramatically transform the balance of power in East Asia, resulting in a sober reassessment of Japan's recent entry onto the world stage. The embarrassing string of defeats increased dissatisfaction of the Russian populace with the inefficient and corrupt Tsarist government, and was a major cause of the Russian Revolution of 1905.

List of battles
Key:

See also

 First Sino-Japanese War (1894–1895)
 Russian invasion of Manchuria (1900)
 Russian Revolution of 1905

References
 Connaughton, Richard (2003). Rising Sun and Tumbling Bear. Cassell.  
 Kowner, Rotem (2006). Historical Dictionary of the Russo-Japanese War. Scarecrow. 
 Nish, Ian (1985). The Origins of the Russo-Japanese War. Longman. 
 Sedwick, F.R. (1909). The Russo-Japanese War. Macmillan.

Korea history-related lists
Russo-Japanese